Together Again is a 2007 album released by Irish singers Daniel O'Donnell and Mary Duff.

Track listing
 Together Again - 3:25
 Top of the World - 3:01
 The Carnival Is Over - 3:20
 My Happiness	- 3:17
 Are You Teasing Me (Charlie Louvin / Ira Louvin) - 2:50
 Timeless And True Love (Charlie Black / Buzz Cason) - 2:41
 You're My Best Friend - 3:05
 Hey, Good Lookin' - 2:13
 Harbour Lights - 2:54
 Do You Think You Could Love Me Again (Kevin Sheerin)	- 2:10
 Til' A Tear Becomes A Rose (Bill Rice / Mary Sharon Rice) - 3:34
 I Don't Care	(Buck Owens) - 2:09
 Yes, Mr. Peters (Steve Karliski / Larry Kolber) - 2:50
 Daddy Was An Old Time Preacher Man (Dolly Parton) - 3:19
 Save Your Love - 3:19

Charts

References

External links
 Daniel O'Donnell's website

2007 albums
Daniel O'Donnell albums